KF United Boys Gjakova is a professional football club from Kosovo which competes in the Third League (Group A). The club is based in Gjakovë. Their home ground is the Gjakovë Sports Complex which has a viewing capacity of 3,000.

See also
 List of football clubs in Kosovo

References

Football clubs in Kosovo
Association football clubs established in 2019